WLNY-TV (channel 55) is an independent television station licensed to Riverhead, New York, United States, serving the New York City television market. It is owned by the CBS News and Stations group alongside CBS flagship WCBS-TV (channel 2). Both stations share studios within the CBS Broadcast Center on West 57th Street in Midtown Manhattan, while WLNY-TV's transmitter is located in Ridge, New York.

WLNY-TV's primary over-the-air signal serves most of Long Island, and the station is available through cable, satellite television and subscription streaming services, in most of the New York City market. It is branded on-air as "WLNY TV 10/55" because of its carriage on cable channel 10 in most of the New York metropolitan area.

History

Proposed WRIV-TV
The origins of channel 55 date back to 1965, when WRIV radio in Riverhead applied for a construction permit for UHF channel 55. The proposed WRIV-TV presumably would have gone on air as a NBC affiliate, due to the presence of WRIV radio's part-owner at the time, NBC News anchor Chet Huntley. WRIV-TV would have filled a coverage hole for NBC on eastern Long Island, as there was limited reception from New York City's WNBC-TV (channel 4) and the UHF signal from WATR-TV (channel 20) in Waterbury, Connecticut. In comparison, eastern Long Island was well served by the Connecticut-based VHF signals from CBS on WTIC-TV (channel 3) and ABC on WNHC-TV (channel 8). WRIV-TV was ready to go on the air by the early 1970s, but the combination of a tough economic environment and the widespread popularity of cable television – which enabled viewers on eastern Long Island to receive New York City television stations clearly – likely prevented WRIV-TV from making it on the air.

WLIG (1985–1996)
The channel 55 allocation remained dormant until 1979, when a group of local investors led by local businessman Michael Pascucci filed for a new construction permit from the Federal Communications Commission (FCC), which was awarded in 1982. Channel 55 went on the air April 28, 1985, as WLIG, with the on-air branding TV-55. It was the first Long Island-based independent television station since the demise of WSNL-TV (channel 67), which had gone dark a decade earlier. The station's first studio was located at its transmitter site in Ridge, while offices were located on Crossways Park Drive in Woodbury, Long Island. Local news was included at the station's launch; a live 30-minute program, News 55 Long Island, began with the station, with just three full-time staff and two camera crews. During its first year of operations, WLIG employed a number of gimmicks to attract viewers, such as a "Watch and Win Sweepstakes" in which viewers were shown a "code word" on-screen during a particular show and had to send in a postcard with that word for the chance to win a prize and offering 100,000 free loop antennas to non-cable viewers who could not receive the station clearly. The efforts paid off, as WLIG gradually became a solid ratings player.

By June 1987, WLIG was estimated to reach 200,000 viewers and was carried on eight of nine cable television providers on Long Island. The lone exception was Cablevision, the largest provider on Long Island, which claimed that WLIG added nothing to the service they already offered, and therefore refused to carry it. A cable subscriber advocacy group, New Yorkers for Fair Cable, claimed that the real reason was that WLIG competed with services that Cablevision owned and offered, specifically News 12 Long Island. In October 1987, BQ Cable Company (later part of Time Warner Cable, now Charter Spectrum) began offering WLIG to subscribers in Brooklyn and Queens.

During its early years, WLIG relied heavily on old movies and reruns of classic television shows and positioned itself as a station offering family-friendly entertainment consistent with the philosophy of its founder, a devout Roman Catholic. Because of Pascucci's relationship with TeLIcare, a cable network run by the Roman Catholic Diocese of Rockville Centre, the station aired some of their locally produced shows. It also featured a daily newscast at 10 p.m. and other local programming, such as a political talk show, Focus on Long Island, sports programming and some first-run syndicated programming rounded out the broadcast schedule.

Pascucci entered into a deal to sell WLIG to First Century Broadcasting, a consortium headed by Ronn Haus, in 1988; Haus's Coast to Coast syndicated religious program aired on WLIG. In announcing the transaction, Pascucci acknowledged the station had made a loss since its construction, though he noted he would continue to operate channel 55 and characterized the transaction as a method of raising capital. The deal then fell through; as a consequence, WLIG dropped its local news broadcasts in April 1989. It fired all but one of its news staff, who was kept on to anchor a five-minute local newscast, inserted into an early evening half-hour feed of CNN Headline News.

WLIG improved in the early 1990s, when it gradually began adding newer films and stronger syndicated programming to its lineup. It scored a major victory in early 1991 when it landed Wheel of Fortune, Jeopardy! and The Oprah Winfrey Show, which at that time were the top three syndicated programs on television; it was able to broadcast them because the station's Riverhead transmitter was outside of the radius of exclusivity of the major New York TV stations. In 1992, after a much-awaited false start, Cablevision finally brought WLIG to its Long Island systems, adding more than 300,000 subscribers to the station's potential audience; by this time, it was breaking even. The station then relocated its main studios to a site on South Service Road in Melville, and in January 1994—after the reinstatement of must-carry laws put it on all remaining Long Island cable systems—it returned to the news game with a new 10 p.m. newscast.

The station was forced off the air when a 1995 wildfire in the Long Island Central Pine Barrens, threatened their transmitting facilities.

WLNY (1996–present)
The implications of must-carry and the consequent expansion of its reach continued to transform channel 55. In early 1996, the station opened news bureaus in Wayne, New Jersey, and Fairfield, Connecticut, and it obtained press credentials in New York City. The station cemented its broader reach and sought to distinguish itself from the multiple stations using "LI" in their call sign when it changed its call letters to WLNY, representing Long Island and New York, on September 1, 1996. The sale of Pascucci's auto leasing business, Pascucci Oxford Resources, in 1997 brought a cash infusion to the television station as well.

Despite its introduction to hundreds of thousands more cable homes as a result of must-carry, its location on the fringes of the New York City television market made cable television coverage of the station an ongoing concern. In 1997, the FCC allowed some cable providers in New Jersey to exclude WLNY from carriage. WLNY, along with WRNN-TV (channel 48) and WPXN-TV (channel 31), appealed, but the courts upheld the FCC decision. When it was purchased by CBS, WLNY's carriage in retransmission consent agreements became tied to that of WCBS-TV and CBS's cable networks (currently with Paramount Global's networks), and it still receives cable coverage from Central New Jersey to Southern Connecticut, and on satellite television.

In 1997, WLNY was assigned UHF channel 57 for its digital television operations, making it one of 18 full-service television stations in the country to have neither analog nor digital assignments within the new core television station spectrum, channels 2 through 51. The station began broadcasting in digital in 2002, with a low-power signal under special temporary authority (STA).

During the spring of 2002, WLNY dropped its "NY 55" branding in favor of the old "TV-55". It then made news in 2005 when it struck a deal with Qualcomm to surrender its analog license and build full digital television transmission facilities on channel 57, allowing Qualcomm to use the channel 55 frequency for its MediaFLO service. At the time, approximately 92% of Long Island's population received television service by cable or satellite, and the station had several repeaters that would remain in analog, so the FCC approved the request, and on December 31, 2005, WLNY shut down its analog signal and became a digital-only station. The FCC later changed the station's callsign to WLNY-DT. The FCC later announced it would remove the -DT suffix from call signs after the analog shutoff unless a station applied to keep it; the station elected to change its callsign to WLNY-TV, adding the -TV suffix the station did not use prior to 2006, and the change took effect on June 19, 2009.

On October 22, 2007, WLNY once again changed its branding, this time from "TV-55" to "TV 10/55" to reflect its most common cable and satellite assignments (for several years prior to the rebranding, it had been using an onscreen graphic identifying the station as "WLNY 55/10"). The station also debuted a new set and graphics for their 11 p.m. newscast, replacing the set that dated back to the early 1990s.

WLNY-DT requested channel 47 as its final in-core broadcast channel after the end of the 2009 DTV conversion, but the FCC initially ruled the election in conflict with another station—WNJU (channel 47), a Spanish-language station licensed to Linden, New Jersey which broadcast its analog signal on channel 47. Eventually the issues were resolved and WLNY gained FCC approval for its move to digital channel 47, which it began broadcasting from on June 13, 2009. On April 9, 2012, WLNY started broadcasting local programming in high definition for the first time.

CBS-owned station
On December 12, 2011, CBS Television Stations announced its intent to purchase WLNY-TV, creating a duopoly with the CBS network's flagship station WCBS-TV. Terms of the purchase were originally not made public, though an FCC application for the purchase later revealed that CBS had purchased WLNY for $55 million. The company announced that it would add additional on-air staff and expand WLNY's local news programming outside the 11 p.m. newscast that the station had at the time. The FCC approved the sale, and CBS took control of the station on June 29, 2012, giving the company its tenth television station duopoly—as well as its largest duopoly by market size.

The sale to CBS did not include repeaters WLNY-CD (channel 45) in Mineola, New York, WLIG-LD (channel 17) in Morristown, New Jersey, and W27CD in Stamford, Connecticut, which were sold separately to Local Media TV Holdings, LLC. On March 12, 2012, WLNY-CD changed its call letters to WMUN-CD and WLIG-LD changed its call letters to WNMF-LD; the WLIG-LP call letters then moved to W17CR, a station in Plainview, New York, that WLNY acquired on November 28, 2011, in a deal originally reached in 2005 and was not involved in the sale of either WLNY-TV or the other repeaters. On March 29, 2012, the day before the completion of WLNY-TV's sale to CBS, WMUN-CD, WNMF-LD and W27CD signed off temporarily in advance of the completion of their sale to Local Media TV Holdings on April 3, due to the end of the feed from WLNY's Melville studios.

In early July 2018, WLNY-TV completed its move to UHF channel 27 under special temporary authority; the station then moved to UHF channel 29 in early August 2019 in phase 4 of the spectrum repack.

On December 4, 2019, CBS Corporation and Viacom remerged into ViacomCBS (now Paramount Global).

A January 2021 investigation by the Los Angeles Times based on complaints to the Pennsylvania Human Relations Commission revealed that, as part of the 2011 transaction by which Pascucci sold WLNY-TV to CBS, Peter Dunn, the head of CBS Television Stations, gained the use of a CBS-paid membership to the exclusive Sebonack Golf Club in Southampton, which Pascucci owns and which gave Dunn connections to billionaires such as fellow member Stephen Ross. Dunn was revealed to have treated this membership as a personal perk of the sale; per the Los Angeles Times, a colleague, CBS Entertainment Group chief operating officer Bryon Rubin, joked about the WLNY purchase as "the acquisition of our golf membership ... I mean TV station" on a private call in December 2020. The investigation, which also raised concerns about alleged racist, sexist and homophobic comments and the work environment at CBS-owned KYW-TV in Philadelphia, led to the network placing Dunn and Steve Friend, the senior vice president of news for the station group, on administrative leave, and their eventual termination.

Programming
Since CBS acquired WLNY in 2012, WLNY carries CBS network programming on occasions that WCBS-TV has preempted the network due to breaking news or severe weather coverage as well as New York Jets football games. As of October 1, 2016, the station carries the Go Time syndicated E/I block. The station airs a Yule Log annually on Christmas Eve and Christmas morning, with holiday music simulcast from 101.1 WCBS-FM, along with Christmas Eve Midnight Mass (11:30 p.m. to 1:30 a.m.) from St. Agnes Cathedral in Rockville Centre, New York.

Sports
This arrangement ended in 2019, when the pay TV-exclusive ACCN launched. During spring 2019, the station added Stadium digital sports network to its third subchannel.

WLNY-TV has also infrequently aired New York Jets preseason games when sister network and main Jets preseason rights holder WCBS-TV has other conflicts. (This arrangement happened in 2017 and 2021 due to CBS' coverage of the PGA Tour.)

Newscasts

WLNY currently airs 12 hours of locally produced newscasts each week. WLNY airs a WCBS-produced newscast weekdays at 7 a.m., and CBS News New York Now each day at 9 p.m.

As an independently owned station, WLIG/WLNY produced a local news program titled News 55, originally at 10 p.m. on weeknights, and a 7 p.m. newscast was later added. While the station had dropped its local newscasts in 1989, it continued to air a nightly five-minute news update (following an early evening feed from CNN Headline News) until a new full-fledged 10 p.m. newscast was launched in January 1994. Prior to the station's sale to CBS, WLNY's newscast ran for 35 minutes at 11 p.m. Monday through Fridays and was rebroadcast Tuesday through Saturday mornings at 5 a.m. WLNY also produced a weekly public affairs show, tv10/55 Focus. The news and public affairs shows focused mostly on Long Island issues, aside from weather and sports coverage, which served most of the New York City market.

On March 15, 2012, it was announced that the station would be suspending its news operations at the end of the month; the last 11 p.m. newscast on the station aired on March 29, 2012, and was subsequently replaced with Entertainment Tonight. The first locally produced program on WLNY under CBS ownership debuted in mid-April 2012: a revamped public affairs show, Exit 10/55, which airs in the same timeslot as tv10/55 Focus.

WLNY resumed regular newscasts on July 2, 2012, with a two-hour morning program, Live from the Couch (which competed against the longer-established morning newscasts on WPIX and Fox-owned WNYW (channel 5); and an hour-long newscast at 9 p.m. Both programs are based out of WCBS-TV's West 57th Street studios in Manhattan. In July 2014, WLNY made the decision to expand its hour long 9 p.m. newscast to weekends, with WCBS' weekend evening staff (Cindy Hsu, Elise Finch, and Steve Overmeyer). The first weekend 9 p.m. newscast aired on July 12, 2014. Additional newscasts are likely to be added in the future. WLNY has received some criticism from the Long Island Fair Media Council accusing the station of abandoning its focus on Long Island. CBS management blamed the lack of coverage on work being done on WLNY's former full-time facility in Melville. The facility, which was converted into a news bureau set up to cover Long Island news stories, was completed in July 2012. On May 23, 2014, WLNY made the decision to cancel Live from the Couch. Although ratings for the newscast are not available, poor ratings were the likely cause for the cancellation.

On April 8, 2019, the newscast was replaced by CBSN New York on WLNY, a rebroadcast of a prime time newscast produced by WCBS' local version of CBSN. The newscast was renamed yet again in October 2021 as CBS2 News at 9, and again in July 2022 as CBS News New York Now, as part of a rebrand across CBS O&O duopolies.

Subchannels
The station's digital signal is multiplexed:

WLNY-TV discontinued operation of its two Mobile DTV feeds, one of subchannel 55.1, labelled "WLNY MH1", and a blank feed of 55.2, labelled "WLNY MH2", broadcasting at 3.67 Mbit/s. This was the highest bitrate of any New York City television station mobile feed.

See also
Channel 10 branded TV stations in the United States
Channel 29 digital TV stations in the United States
Channel 55 virtual TV stations in the United States

References

External links

Independent television stations in the United States
Television channels and stations established in 1985
LNY-TV
CBS News and Stations
Comet (TV network) affiliates
Stadium (sports network) affiliates
This TV affiliates
Circle (TV network) affiliates
Mass media in Suffolk County, New York
1985 establishments in New York (state)